Cecil Thomas Frederick Willard (16 January 1924 – 6 May 2005), known as Jess Willard, was an English professional footballer who played as a right half and inside forward in the Football League for Brighton & Hove Albion and Crystal Palace. After his retirement from playing he became a coach and trainer, first managing the youth team and serving as first team coach at Crystal Palace, then later working as trainer at Brentford and presiding over one match as caretaker manager in January 1975.

Personal life 
Willard attended the Lancastrian School in his home town of Chichester and later worked for Shippam's. He boxed in his youth and acquired the nickname "Jess". Willard served in the Royal Air Force during the Second World War. As of March 2001, Willard was living in Turners Hill Park, Sussex.

References 

English footballers
English Football League players
1924 births
2005 deaths
Sportspeople from Chichester
Association football wing halves
Association football inside forwards
Chichester City F.C. (1873) players
Brighton & Hove Albion F.C. players
Crystal Palace F.C. players
Brentford F.C. managers
Crystal Palace F.C. non-playing staff
Royal Air Force personnel of World War II
English football managers
People from Turners Hill